Arbor Park is a multi-use stadium in Newcastle, KwaZulu-Natal, South Africa. It is currently used mostly for football matches and is the home venue of Newcastle Sicilians F.C. in the Vodacom League.

Sports venues in KwaZulu-Natal
Soccer venues in South Africa
Multi-purpose stadiums in South Africa